Catspaw Glacier is a small alpine glacier just west of Stocking Glacier, flowing south from the slopes north of Taylor Glacier, in Victoria Land. It was so named by Thomas Griffith Taylor of the British Antarctic Expedition, 1910–13, because of its resemblance to a cat's paw.

Further reading
 Kelly Chan-Yam, Characterisation of microbial communities in a water track in an Antarctic Dry Valley, 2017
 Charles Neider, Edge of the World: Ross Island, Antarctica, P 349

References
 

Glaciers of McMurdo Dry Valleys